The 2017 World Rowing Championships were the 47th edition of the World Rowing Championships that were held from 24 September to 1 October 2017 in Sarasota, Florida.

Host selection
During 2013, Plovdiv and Sarasota, Florida both applied to host the 2017 World Rowing Championships. In April 2013, a committee of International Rowing Federation (FISA) officials visited Sarasota and then Plovdiv the following month. It was then noted that Plovdiv had hosted the 2012 World Rowing Championships and bid documentation for 2017 had not been finalized. Before the next FISA congress, the bid from Plovdiv was changed to apply for the 2018 hosting rights. At the FISA Congress held on 2 September 2013, hosting rights were assigned by unanimous decision for World Rowing Championships to Sarasota for 2017, Plovdiv for 2018, and Plovdiv for the 2015 World Rowing U23 Championships.

Medals

Rowing

Para rowing

Medal summary
 Non-Olympic classes

Men's events

Women's events

Para-rowing (adaptive) events
All boat classes (except PR3Mix2x) are also Paralympic.

Event codes

References

External links
 Official website
 WorldRowing website

 
2017
Rowing
2017 in rowing
2017 in sports in Florida
2017 World Rowing Championships
2017 in American sports
Sports in Sarasota, Florida
September 2017 sports events in the United States
October 2017 sports events in the United States